Nebria merkliana is a species of ground beetle in the Nebriinae subfamily that can be found in Bulgaria and Turkey.

References

merkliana
Beetles described in 1904
Beetles of Asia
Beetles of Europe